Dumar-e Olya (also Romanized as Dūmār-e ‘Olyā; also known as Do Ghār-e Bālā, Dūmār, and Dūmār-e Bālā) is a village in Saghder Rural District, Jebalbarez District, Jiroft County, Kerman Province, Iran. At the 2006 census, its population was 15, in 5 families.

References 

Populated places in Jiroft County